Richard Berkeley (by 1465 – 1513 or later) was an English politician.

He was a Member (MP) of the Parliament of England for Winchelsea in 1495 and 1497, and for Rye in 1504 and 1510.

References

15th-century births
16th-century deaths
English MPs 1497
English MPs 1504
English MPs 1510
English MPs 1495